Ben Yu (born January 8, 1986) is an American professional poker player, commentator, and writer. He has won four World Series of Poker bracelets and appeared at 15 World Series of Poker final tables. Yu, who grew up in Los Angeles, California, attended Stanford University before transitioning into a career in poker.

Poker career

As of June 2018, Yu has amassed more than $5,000,000 in live poker tournament earnings, with his 70 cashes at the World Series of Poker accounting for $4,061,695 of those winnings.

Yu's columns on poker tournament strategy have appeared in Card Player magazine since 2013.

World Series of Poker 
Yu's seven cashes at the 2011 World Series of Poker tied him with Kirill Rabtsov for the most in the 2011 series.

At the 2015 World Series of Poker, Yu won the $10,000 Limit Hold'em Championship for $291,456.

Yu's six cashes in World Series of Poker Limit Hold'em events, including three final table finishes, total $454,083, rank him 18th all-time.

References

American poker players
Living people
World Series of Poker bracelet winners
People from Dayton, Ohio
1986 births